, provisional designation , is a sub-kilometer asteroid and Mars trojan orbiting 60° behind the orbit of Mars near the .

Discovery, orbit and physical properties 

 was discovered on 1 February 2001 by the Spacewatch program, observing from Steward Observatory, Kitt Peak and classified as Mars-crosser by the Minor Planet Center. Its orbit is characterized by low eccentricity (0.035), moderate inclination (24.4º) and a semi-major axis of 1.52 AU. Its orbit is well determined as it is currently (March 2013) based on 45 observations with a data-arc span of 3,148 days. It has an absolute magnitude of 19.7 which gives a characteristic diameter of 562 m.

Mars trojan and orbital evolution 

It was identified as Mars trojan by H. Scholl, F. Marzari and P. Tricarico in 2005 and its dynamical half-lifetime was found to be of the order of the age of the Solar System. Recent calculations confirm that it is indeed a stable  Mars trojan with a libration period of 1365 yr and an amplitude of 11°. These values as well as its short-term orbital evolution are very similar to those of 5261 Eureka.

Origin 

Long-term numerical integrations show that its orbit is very stable on Gyr time-scales (1 Gyr = 1 billion years). As in the case of Eureka, calculations in both directions of time (4.5 Gyr into the past and 4.5 Gyr into the future) indicate that  may be a primordial object, perhaps a survivor of the planetesimal population that formed in the terrestrial planets region early in the history of the Solar System.

See also 
 5261 Eureka (1990 MB)

References

Further reading 
 2001 DH47 Ivashchenko, Y., Ostafijchuk, P., Spahr, T. B. 2007, Minor Planet Electronic Circular, 2007-P09.
 Dynamics of Mars Trojans Scholl, H., Marzari, F., Tricarico, P. 2005, Icarus, Volume 175, Issue 2, pp. 397–408.
 Three new stable L5 Mars Trojans de la Fuente Marcos, C., de la Fuente Marcos, R. 2013, Monthly Notices of the Royal Astronomical Society: Letters, Vol. 432, Issue 1, pp. 31–35.

External links 
  data at MPC
 
 

385250
385250
385250
20010220